HMS Otter was a Vickers three-funnel, 30-knot destroyer ordered by the Royal Navy under the 1895–1896 Naval Estimates.  She was the fourth ship to carry this name since it was introduced in 1782 for a fire ship, sold in 1801.

Construction and career
She was laid down on 9 June 1896, at the Barrow Shipbuilding Company shipyard at Barrow-in-Furness, and launched on 23 November 1896. During her builder's trials she made her contracted speed requirement. In 1897 during the construction of these ships, the Barrow Shipbuilding Company was purchases by Vickers, Sons and Maxim and renamed as the Naval Construction and Armaments Shipyard. She was completed and accepted by the Royal Navy in March 1900. Her temporary officer in command for the voyage was Lieutenant Henry Douglas Wilkin. She arrived at the station after the Boxer Rebellion operations were completed, and was based at Hong Kong.

Her boilers were re-tubed and her hull and machinery refitted in 1902.

On 30 August 1912 the Admiralty directed all destroyer classes were to be designated by alpha characters starting with the letter 'A'. After 30 September 1913, she was known as a C-class destroyer and had the letter 'C' painted on the hull below the bridge area and on either the fore or aft funnel.

World War I
In August 1914 she was slated for disposal but the outbreak of the First World War granted her a reprieve.

In 1916 she was paid off and laid-up in awaiting disposal. She was finally sold on 25 October 1916 for breaking in Hong Kong.

Pennant numbers
It is unknown if she was assigned a pennant number as no record has been found.

References
NOTE:  All tabular data under General Characteristics only from the listed Jane's Fighting Ships volume unless otherwise specified

Bibliography
 
 
 
 
 
 
 
 

 

Ships built in Barrow-in-Furness
1896 ships
C-class destroyers (1913)
World War I destroyers of the United Kingdom